The 2004 All-Ireland Under-21 Hurling Championship was the 41st staging of the All-Ireland Under-21 Hurling Championship, the Gaelic Athletic Association's premier inter-county hurling tournament for players under the age of twenty-one. The championship began on 2 June 2004 and ended on 18 September 2004.

Kilkenny were the defending champions.

The All-Ireland final was played on 18 September 2004 at Nowlan Park in Kilkenny, between Kilkenny and Tipperary, in what was their first meeting in a final in 9 years. Kilkenny won the match by 3-21 to 1-06 to claim their 9th championship title overall and a second title in succession.

Tipperary's Tony Scroope was the championship's top scorer with 5-20.

Results

Leinster Under-21 Hurling Championship

Quarter-final

Semi-finals

Final

Munster Under-21 Hurling Championship

Quarter-finals

Semi-finals

Final

Ulster Under-21 Hurling Championship

Semi-final

Final

All-Ireland Under-21 Hurling Championship

Semi-finals

Final

Championship statistics

Top scorers

Top scorers overall

Top scorers in a single game

References

Under-21
All-Ireland Under-21 Hurling Championship